Timur Eshba is a former Minister for Agriculture of Abkhazia. He was appointed by President Raul Khajimba on 8 April 2015 into the cabinet of new Prime Minister Artur Mikvabia, succeeding Rafik Otyrba. On 24 August 2016, after Mikvabia had been replaced as Prime Minister by Beslan Bartsits, Eshba was replaced by veteran politician Daur Tarba.

References

Living people
Ministers for Agriculture of Abkhazia
Heads of Gulripshi District
Year of birth missing (living people)